James King is an American multi-instrumentalist who is a co-founder for soul band Fitz and the Tantrums. In 2008, he was approached by college friend Michael Fitzpatrick to play saxophone on a few songs that he had written which turned out to be the beginnings of Fitz and the Tantrums.  King recommended Noelle Scaggs and other musicians.  They performed for the first time a week later at Hollywood's Hotel Café.  They released their debut EP Songs for a Breakup, Vol. 1 in August 2009, and the tracks soon received airplay on public radio station KCRW in Los Angeles.

Six months after their first performance they had slots at Lollapalooza and Telluride Blues & Brews. In late 2009 they toured with Hepcat, Flogging Molly, and opened eight concerts for Maroon 5. The band signed to Dangerbird Records in April 2010, 
Their first full-length album, Pickin' Up the Pieces was released on August 24, 2010. It received critical acclaim and reached No. 1 on the Billboard Heatseekers chart, 140 on the Billboard 200, and 18 on the Independent Albums chart.

They were called by Vogue Magazine the "Hardest Working Band of 2011". According to Rolling Stone, the band "throws a sparkling pop gloss on a familiar Motown sound"

Background
King was raised by a jazz guitarist father and a classical cellist mother. They introduced him to a wide range of music from an early age. In addition to the jazz training and classical training that he started at age five, he also started learning guitar, violin and piano before settling on the flute when he was nine years old; he added the saxophone when he was 11. King studied music privately and attended Los Angeles County High School for the Arts for his last two years of high school, after which he attended the California Institute of the Arts (1993–1999), where he went to earn his Bachelor of Fine Arts degree in jazz performance. Before, King worked on a wide range of projects in the music industry and taught at the Silverlake Conservatory of Music.

Discography

Fitz and the Tantrums
Studio albums
2009: Songs for a Breakup, Vol. 1  
2010: Santa Stole My Lady  
2010: Pickin' Up the Pieces 
2013: More Than Just a Dream 
2016: Fitz and the Tantrums

Other work
2000–2010: Domingosiete  ("saxofonista")
2001–2010: Breakestra 
2002–2010: Connie Price and the Keystones
2004–2005: Orgone
2008–2009: Composer, Nic and Tristan Go Mega-Dega 
2008–2010: The Lions 
2010: Performed in Burlesque starring Cher and Christina Aguilera
2013: Fanfare Jonathan Wilson album, saxophone and flute
2014: "Weird Al" Yankovic Mandatory Fun, saxophone

References

External links
Fitz and the Tantrums' official website
Fitz and the Tantrums on iTunes
Music festivals interview, June 2014

Year of birth missing (living people)
American soul singers
California Institute of the Arts alumni
Fitz and The Tantrums members
Living people
Place of birth missing (living people)